The Popes are a band originally formed by Shane MacGowan (of the Pogues) and Paul "Mad Dog" McGuinness, who play a blend of rock, Irish folk and Americana.

Shane MacGowan and The Popes released two studio and one live album in the 1990s, performing live together until 2005. During this era, The Popes also recorded and gigged on their own until 2006.  At the end of 2006, guitarist Paul "Mad Dog" McGuinness reformed the band with a new line up and leads it to this day.

History

1992–1998: Shane MacGowan and The Popes
After departing the Pogues, singer Shane MacGowan put together a new band, started with a group of people from the Pogues' extended family including Paul "Mad Dog" McGuinness and Tommy McManamon.

McGuinness and Tom Gerry McManamon formed the core of the band, on guitar and tenor banjo respectively. Soundman Dave Jordon and road manager Big Charlie MacLennan also followed MacGowan to the Popes. Joining them were guitarist Mo O'Hagan and bass player Bernie France, who had both played with MacGowan in a short-lived group called the London Contemporary Five (France was also an old friend and one-time teenage bandmate of MacGowan's, in the group Hot Dogs With Everything). Ex-Exploited and Boothill Foot Tappers drummer Danny Heatly and whistle player Colm O'Maonlai rounded out the original group.

It was this lineup that Johnny Depp joined appearing with them on Top of the Pops and other music shows. He directed and appeared in the video of "That Woman's Got Me Drinking".

Of this initial line-up, only McGuinness and McManamon would last the entirety of Shane MacGowan's tenure with the group. France was replaced by Bob Dowling on bass, Heatley left later, to be replaced by Andy Ireland.

1998–2006: The Popes
As well as backing MacGowan both live and on his solo albums, the McGuinness–McManamon incarnation of The Popes recorded a few singles and one studio album, Holloway Boulevard, released in March 2000. A live album, Release The Beast (Live in London 2003), followed in 2004.

Producer and sound man Dave Jordan died of a heroin overdose in Paris while on the road with the band in March 1995, followed in October 1996 by Charlie MacLennan, who died of a drug-induced heart attack. Ten years later, the long battle with illness from liver disease and subsequent death on 15 December 2006 of founding member Tom McManamon (born on 30 May 1961 in London, England) would put an end to Shane MacGowan and The Popes. 
 
The Popes played their final show with MacGowan on 17 March 2005, and had disintegrated by the time of McManamon's death in December 2006.

2006–present: The Popes reformed
Following the death of banjo player Tommy McManamon at the end of 2006, Paul McGuinness reformed The Popes with a new album in the works and a new line-up including Charlie Hoskyns (Lisa Knapp, Badly Mixed Bastards) on guitar, Will Morrison (Here be Dragons, Lisa Knapp) on drums, Laurie Norwood on bass and Ben Gunnery on fiddle.

The album was eventually released in 2009 as Outlaw Heaven, featuring Fiachra Shanks on banjo and Shane MacGowan as a guest vocalist on three songs, with Pogue Spider Stacy joining MacGowan and McGuinness on vocals on the title track.

The line-up changed once again with the arrival of Jim McAllister on bass, Dave Allen on fiddle and Whiskey Mick Rowan on mandolin.

The band toured internationally before releasing a follow-up in 2012, New Church. The album was followed by another tour including dates opening for The Stranglers. Shortly after the release of New Church, Charlie Hoskyns left the band and was replaced by Ian Bramble on guitar and backing vocals. Jim McAllister also left the band and was replaced by Greg Courtney on bass.

During 2012 and 2013, this lineup of The Popes toured extensively in Europe and Australia. A new album with new material written by Paul McGuinness and the new line-up, and previous material telling the story of The Popes, was planned for 2014, although the band has been on an extended hiatus due to a brain injury suffered by McGuinness in November 2013 (see the next section below).

Later Activities
A memorial for McManamon in March 2007 saw Bob Dowling, Andy Ireland, and Brian Kelly reunite as The Popes, joined by Miriam Kavana and Denis Dowling.

Accordion player Andy Nolan went on to The BibleCode Sundays.

Banjo player Brian Kelly went on to Creeds Cross, and released two instrumental records under his own name.

Violinist Dave Allen and guitarist Ian Bramble released a Christmas song and an album with John Coghlan.

Drummer Will Morrison has played in Welsh band Here Be Dragons.

In November 2013, Paul McGuinness suffered a serious head injury that left him hospitalized for months.  As of 8 June 2014, he was still residing in the brain injury rehabilitation unit at Homerton Hospital.

Personnel

Current members
 Paul "Mad Dog" McGuinness – Guitar, vocals (1993–present)
 Ian Bramble – Guitar, vocals (2012–present)
 Will Morrison – Drums (2006–present)
 Greg Courtney – Bass, vocals (2012–present)
 Dave Allen – Fiddle, mandolin, vocals (2009–present)
 Whiskey Mick Rowan – Mandolin, vocals (2009–present)

Former members
 Tom "The Beast" McManamon, aka "Tom McAnimal" – tenor banjo (1993–2006)
 Danny Heatley, aka "Danny Pope" – drums, percussion, backing vocals (1993–1998)
 Bernie "The Undertaker" France – bass, vocals (1993–1996)
 Kieran "Mo" O'Hagan – guitar, backing vocals (1993–1994)
 Leeson O'Keeffe – lead guitar, 5-string banjo, backing vocals (1993-1994) (live only)
 Colm O'Maonlai – whistles (1993–1994)
 Paul Conlon – whistle (1994–1995) (live only)
 John "The Riddler" Myers – fiddle, whistle, guitar (1995–1998)
 Bob "Lucky" Dowling – bass, backing vocals (1996–2006)
 "Slimy" Kieran Kiely – accordion, whistle, backing vocals (1995–1999)
 Andy "Reg" Ireland – drums, percussion (1998–2006)
 Andy Nolan – accordion, ? (1999–?) 
 Mick O'Connel – accordion, ? (?–2002)
 Brian Kelly – tenor banjo (??–??) 
 Mirian Kavana – fiddle (??–??) 
 Charlie Hoskyns – Guitars and Backing Vocals (2006–2012)
 Gerry Diver – Fiddle & Banjo (2006–?)
 Laurie Norwood – bass (2006–?)
 Ben Gunnery – violin, mandolin (2006–?)
 Fiachra Shanks – tenor banjo, mandolin, guitar (2009?)
 Jim McAllister – Bass and Backing Vocals (2009–2012)
 Leeson O'Keeffe – lead guitar, 5-string banjo, backing vocals (1993–94) (touring only)

Associated musicians
 Brian "Robo" Robertson – guest guitar (The Snake), producer (Christmas Party E.P. '96, My Way)
 Dave Jordan – producer (Church of the Holy Spook EP, The Snake), live sound
 Ed Deane – lap steel & Spanish guitar on The Crock of Gold; occasional live performance
 Gerry Diver – fiddles on Outlaw Heaven and New Church
 Joey Cashman – manager, occasional whistle (live)
 Johnny Depp – guest guitar ("That Woman's Got Me Drinking"), plus some live promo performances (including Top of the Pops), director (video for "That Woman's Got Me Drinking").
 Miriam Kavana - fiddle on Holloway Boulevard, occasional live
 Ron Kavana – member of an early line-up, played guitar on "Haunted", wrote melody for "Snake With Eyes of Garnet"
  Sarge O'Hara – piano, producer, co-wrote "Sleepless Nights"
 Siobhan MacGowan – Shane's sister, occasional duet part on "Fairytale of New York" (live), backing vocals (live)
 Spider Stacy – guest whistle (The Snake), guest vocals (Holloway Boulevard), whistle on some live dates in 1998
 Teressa MacGowan – Shane's mother, occasional duet part on "Fairytale of New York" (live) (Across the Broad Atlantic)

Discography

Albums

As Shane MacGowan & The Popes
 The Snake (October 1994) (studio #1)
 The Crock of Gold (October 1997) (studio #2)
 The Rare Oul' Stuff (2001 / January 2002) (a 2-disc best-of collection of B-sides and key album tracks spanning the years 1994 to 1998)
 Across the Broad Atlantic: Live on Paddy's Day – New York and Dublin (February 2002) (live #1)

As The Popes
 Holloway Boulevard (March 2000) (studio #3; including three tracks written by Shane MacGowan)
 Release the Beast (Live in London 2003) (August 2004) (live #2; a two-disc set including a live album recorded in 2003 at The Hammersmith & Fulham Irish Centre in London as disc 1 and a re-release of Holloway Boulevard as disc 2)
 Outlaw Heaven (May 2009) (studio #4; including special guest Shane MacGowan on three tracks)
 New Church (March 2012) (studio #5)

EPs

As Shane MacGowan & The Popes
 The Church of the Holy Spook (1994)
 My Way (1996)
 Christmas Party EP (1996)

As The Popes
 Are You Looking at Me? (1998)

DVDs

As Shane MacGowan & The Popes
 Live at Montreux 1995 (November 2004)

References

External links
 Official Shane MacGowan website
 The Popes official website
 The Brian Whelan official website

Irish rock music groups
Celtic punk groups